This is a list of artists who recorded for A&M Records.
Listed in parentheses are the names of A&M-affiliated labels for which the artist recorded.



0–9
 16 Horsepower
 The 28th Street Crew (Vendetta/A&M)
 3rd Party (DV8/A&M)
 .38 Special
 4 Runner
 52nd Street

A
 Mick Abrahams
 Automatic 7
 A Certain Ratio
 Active Force
 Bryan Adams
 Alessi Brothers
 Peter Allen
 María Conchita Alonso
 Herb Alpert
 Herb Alpert & the Tijuana Brass
 Apink (SM Entertainment/A&M)
 Jann Arden
 Armageddon
 Joan Armatrading
 Athletico Spizz 80
 Atlantic Starr
 Hoyt Axton
 Ayers Rock
 Ayọ
 Steve Azar (River North/A&M)

B
 Burt Bacharach
 Bad Boys Inc
 The Badlees (Atlas/A&M)
 Henry Badowski
 David Baerwald
 Joan Baez
 Baja Marimba Band
 David Batteau
 Arthur Baker
 Gato Barbieri
 Bass is Base
 Bazuka
 Véronique Béliveau (Canada)
 Bell & James
 Marc Benno
 George Benson
 Big Pig
 Big Sugar
 Black
 Black Eyed Peas (will.i.am/A&M)
 Blodwyn Pig
 The Blue Nile (US)
 Blues Traveler
 The Bluetones
 Boys Republic (Rainbow/A&M)
 Brigid Boden
 Booker T. & Priscilla
 Boy Meets Girl
 Boyce and Hart
 Liona Boyd
 The Brat Pack (Vendetta/A&M)
 Bricklin
 Breathe (Virgin/A&M) (US)
 Brewer & Shipley
 Sarah Brightman
 Elkie Brooks
 The Brothers Johnson
 Charity Brown
 Dennis Brown
 Sam Brown
 Chris de Burgh
 Burlap to Cashmere
 Glen Burtnik
 Butterfly Boucher

C
 John Cale
 Captain & Tennille
 Captain Beefheart
 Captain Sensible
 Vanessa Carlton
 Kim Carnes
 Carpenters
 Karen Carpenter
 Richard Carpenter
 Dina Carroll
 The Caulfields
 A Certain Ratio
 Checkmates, Ltd.
 Cheech & Chong (Ode/A&M)
 Don Cherry
 Toni Childs
 Chilliwack
 China Crisis
 Gene Clark
 Jimmy Cliff
 Bruce Cockburn
 Joe Cocker (A&M North America)
 Cold
 Ornette Coleman
 Concrete Blonde (I.R.S./A&M)
 Rita Coolidge
 Stewart Copeland
 Chris Cornell
 David Crosby
 Sheryl Crow
 Billy Crystal
 Tony Camillo's Bazuka
 Cud
 Tim Curry

D
 Elizabeth Daily
 Daley
 Dancer
 Michael Damian (Cypress/A&M)
 David & David
 Davis Daniel
 Deadly Venoms
 Dean (Cube/A&M)
 Chris de Burgh
 DeeDeee (A&M Menado)
 Del Amitri
 Sandy Denny
 Paul Desmond
 Barry De Vorzon
 Dennis DeYoung
 Jim Diamond
 The Dickies
 Difford and Tilbrook
 Dillard & Clark
 Dishwalla
 Doc Holliday
 Dodgy
 Double (US, leased from Polydor)
 The Dream Syndicate
 Driveblind
 Driver
 Drop City Yacht Club (Exit 8/A&M/Octone)
 Dropping Daylight (Octone/A&M)
 Dub Pistols (1500/A&M)
 Dubstar (Polydor/A&M)
 Duffy (except US)
 Judith Durham

E
 Earth Quake
 Billy Eckstine
 Elgin
 England Dan & John Ford Coley
 Enormous
 Envy & Other Sins
 Epex (C9 Entertainment/Interscope/A&M)
 Espionage
 The Europeans
 Extreme

F
 Face to Face
 The Faders (Polydor/A&M)
 Fairport Convention
 Falco (A&M North America)
 The Feelies
 Fergie (will.i.am/A&M)
 Fig Dish
 Tim Finn
 Flying Burrito Brothers
 Flyleaf (Octone/A&M)
 For Real (Perspective/A&M)
 Peter Frampton
 Free (North America)
 Lewis Furey

G
 Gallagher and Lyle
 Giant
 Giant Steps
 Gin Blossoms
 The Go-Go's (I.R.S./A&M)
 God Lives Underwater
 Gold
 Lesley Gore
 Graham Gouldman
 The Graces
Kat Graham
 Amy Grant (Myrrh/A&M)
 Al Green
 Patty Griffin
 Scott Grimes
 Henry Gross
 Gun

H
 Jim Hall
 Lani Hall
 Richie Havens
 Murray Head
 Head East
 The Headpins (Solid Gold/A&M Canada)
 Richard X. Heyman (Cypress/A&M)
 John Hiatt
 Rupert Hine
 Robyn Hitchcock and the Egyptians
 Roger Hodgson
 David Holmes (1500/A&M)
 Holy Soldier (eponymous debut album only, co-released with Myrrh Records)
 Hoodoo Gurus
 Hookfoot
 Hope
 Marques Houston
 Hudson Ford
 The Human League (Virgin/A&M US)
 Humble Pie
 Hummingbird
 Paul Hyde and the Payolas

I
 James Ingram
 The Innocence Mission
 Intelligent Hoodlum

J
 J. The Jewish News of Northern California
 Jackopierce
 Susan Jacks (Casino/A&M Canada)
 Terry Jacks
 Janet Jackson
 Joe Jackson
 Chas Jankel
 Tom Jans
 Garland Jeffreys
 Waylon Jennings
 Antonio Carlos Jobim
 Elton John (Rocket/A&M Associated Labels) (US)
 Howard Johnson
 Pete Jolly
 Booker T. Jones
 Marti Jones
 Quincy Jones
 Elton John
 Jesse Johnson
 Jonzun Crew
 Michael Jonzun
 Maurice Joshua (Vendetta/A&M)
 Joya (Perspective/A&M)

K
 Keel (Gold Mountain/A&M)
 Toby Keith
 Paul Kelly
 Kiddo
 Andy Kim  (A&M Canada)
 King Harvest
 Kitchens of Distinction (One Little Indian/A&M) (US)
 K'naan (Octone/A&M)
 Jerry Knight
 Steve Kolander (River North/A&M)
 Kurupt (ANTRA/A&M)

L
 Annabel Lamb
 Jonny Lang
 Denis Leary
 Peggy Lee
   Albert Lee
   Arthur Lee
 Lee Seung-Cheol (A&M Japan)
 Little Nell
 Charles Lloyd
 Lo-Key (Perspective/A&M)
 Lodgic
 Nils Lofgren
 Claudine Longet
 Denise Lopez (Vendetta/A&M)
 Love Battery (Atlas/A&M)
 The Lover Speaks
 L.T.D.
 The Lucy Show
 Lustre
 Lutefisk

M
 Ashley MacIsaac
 Magma
 Majestic Warriors (Tabu/A&M)
 Chuck Mangione
 Gap Mangione
 Billy Mann (DV8/A&M)
 Herbie Mann
 Maroon 5 (Octone/A&M)
 Steve Marriott
 Nancy Martinez (Vendetta/A&M)
 Groucho Marx
 Hugh Masekela
 Mayday
 Letta Mbulu
 Bob McGrath
 Sister Janet Mead
 Glenn Medeiros
 Bill Medley
 Sérgio Mendes
 Mental As Anything
 The Merry-Go-Round
 Lee Michaels
 The Miller Stain Limit
 Liza Minnelli
 Mint Condition (Perspective/A&M)
 Monster Magnet
 Chris Montez
 Wes Montgomery
 Betty Moon
 The Move
 Gerry Mulligan
 Samantha Mumba (Polydor/A&M)
 Michael Murphey
 MxPx
 Mýa

N
 Milton Nascimento
 Nazareth
 NCT 127 (U-Cube/A&M)
 Ann Nesby (Perspective/A&M)
 Aaron Neville
 Neville Brothers
 New Riders of the Purple Sage
 Nirvana: Nevermind (1991 album, 30th Anniversary Edition 1991-2021)
 Noise Therapy
 Laura Nyro (Cypress/A&M)

O
 Philip Oakey and Giorgio Moroder (Virgin/A&M) (US)
 Carroll O'Connor
 Hazel O'Connor
 Alexander O'Neal (Tabu/A&M)
 Shaquille O'Neal (TWIsM/A&M)
 Phil Ochs
 Offenbach (A&M Canada)
 Oingo Boingo
 Old Hickory
 One 2 Many
 Orbit
 Orchestral Manoeuvres in the Dark (Virgin/A&M) (US)
 Jeffrey Osborne
 Overweight Pooch
 Ozark Mountain Daredevils

P
 Pablo Cruise
 The Pale
Paper Tongues
 Felix Pappalardi and Creation 
 The Parade
 Payolas
 Charlie Peacock
 The Pecadiloes
 CeCe Peniston
 Fred Penner
 Persuasions
 Shawn Phillips
 Piper
 The Police
 Pat Poor
 Iggy Pop
 Billy Porter (DV8/A&M)
 Billy Preston
 Procol Harum (US)
 Public Announcement
 The Pussycat Dolls (Interscope/A&M)

Q
 Queen (Hollywood/A&M) (Canada)
 Queen Latifah (Flavor Unit/Creative Battery/AEG Live/A&M)

R
 The Raes
 Raffi (Shoreline/A&M) (US)
 Billy Rankin
 Tommy Reilly
 Emitt Rhodes
 Miguel Rios
 Nicola Roberts
 Rockie Robbins
 Jimmie Rodgers
 The Rolling Stones
 The Ronettes
 Brenda Russell

S
 Astrid S (Sonet/A&M)
 S Club 7 (Polydor/A&M US)
 Sad Café (US/Canada)
 The Sandpipers
 Nicole Scherzinger (Interscope/A&M) 
 Bob Schneider
 Steve Scott
 Seatrain
 Seawind
 Seduction (Vendetta/A&M)
 Michael Sembello
 Shango
 Roxanne Shanté (A&M UK & Éire)
 Feargal Sharkey (A&M US)
 Sharon, Lois & Bram (Elephant/A&M Canada)
 Tommy Shaw
 Ben Sidran
 Simian Mobile Disco
 Simple Minds (Virgin/A&M) (US)
 Smooth (Perspective/A&M)
 Snow Patrol (Polydor/A&M)
 Sounds of Blackness (Perspective/A&M)
 Soundgarden
 David Spinozza
 Splinter (Dark Horse/A&M)
 Split Enz (outside Australia/New Zealand)
 The Spizzles
 Spooky Tooth (US/Canada)
 Squeeze
 Status Quo (A&M US)
 Stealers Wheel
 Cat Stevens (A&M North America)
 Strafe
 The Stranglers (A&M US)
 Strawbs
 Styx
 Andy Summers
 Andy Summers and Robert Fripp
 Sun Ra
 SuperHeavy (2011-  )
 Supertramp
 Swervedriver
 The Swimming Pool Q's

T
 Ta Mara and the Seen
 Tarney Spencer Band
 Temple of the Dog
 Bobby Tench
 Jean Terrell 
 Sonny Terry and Brownie McGhee
 Therapy?
 Marlo Thomas
 Ali Thomson
 Michael Tolcher (Octone/A&M)
 Tom Gurl Four (TUG/A&M)
 Tora Tora
 Total Eclipse (Tabu/A&M)
 Tower of Power (Cypress/A&M)
 T. Rex (US)
 The Tubes
 Ike & Tina Turner

U
 UB40 (Virgin/A&M) (US)
 Ugly Duckling (1500/A&M)

V
Valdy (A&M Canada)
Melvin Van Peebles
Gino Vannelli
Suzanne Vega
Rosie Vela
Vesta
Vital Signs

W
 The Wagoneers
 WAii (A&M Japan)
 Rick Wakeman
 The Wanted
 WaT (A&M Japan)
 Johnny "Guitar" Watson
 Julius Wechter & the Baja Marimba Band
 We Five
 Tim Weisberg
 Cory Wells
 West End one of a series of aliases for producer Eddie Gordon, all under dance label AM:PM
 West End Girls (A&M Canada)
 Caron Wheeler (Perspective/A&M)
 Barry White
 David Wilcox
 Paul Williams
 Shanice Wilson
 Paul Winter
 Bill Withers
 Gary Wright
 Bill Wyman
 will.i.am (will.i.am Music Group/A&M)

Y
 Y&T
 Yellow Magic Orchestra

Z
 Lenny Zakatek
 Zakiya (DV8/A&M)

References 
  Artists signed to A&M Records and its affiliated labels

 
A and M Records, former